M.Y.O.B. (also known as Mind Your Own Business) is an American sitcom starring Katharine Towne and Lauren Graham. The series premiered on NBC on June 6 and ended on June 27, 2000. Eight episodes were produced, but only four were aired by NBC. It was effectively burned off when The WB picked up Gilmore Girls to series the month before, which would star Graham.

Cast and characters

Main
Katharine Towne as Riley Veatch, a teen runaway from Akron, Ohio, who is searching for her birth mother
Colin Mortensen as A.J. Swartz
Lauren Graham as Opal Marie Brown, Riley's aunt and the assistant principal at Gossett High School
Paul Fitzgerald as Mitch Levitt
Amanda Detmer as Lisa Overbeck

Recurring
 Drew Hastings as Arthur, Lisa's Boyfriend
 Andy Dick as Nigel Thorns

Guest Stars
 Alan Cumming as Dave

Production
The pilot episode, filmed in early 1999, stars Nicki Aycox, with Elizabeth Perkins as the aunt.

Episodes
The first two episodes of the series are registered with the United States Copyright Office.

References

External links

2000 American television series debuts
2000 American television series endings
2000s American single-camera sitcoms
2000s American teen sitcoms
English-language television shows
NBC original programming
Television series about teenagers
Television series by Universal Television
Television shows set in California